Kulinism (Bengali: কৌলিন্য) or Kulin Pratha is a custom that was introduced by Raja Ballala Sena of Bengal. Kulin groups could be found among the three castes of Brahmin, Vaidya and Kayastha. It created a separate highly privileged category among these upper castes. The name derives from the Sanskrit word कुलीन (kulina). According to Kulinism, a few families in different castes were considered noble or superior to other families in the same caste.  Kulinism (higher social status) refers to marriage of a kulina girl to a man in the same class as well as marriage to one in a higher class. It essentially asserts that a kulina woman must not have her status lowered by marrying into a group of lower rank. One's Kulin status remains valid for 36-years according to the rules stated by Ballala Sena.

References

 Hindu ethics